Statistics of Emperor's Cup in the 1938 season.

Overview
It was contested by 5 teams, and Waseda University won the championship.

Results

Quarterfinals
Kwansei Gakuin University 5–0 Nagoya Technical College

Semifinals
Kwansei Gakuin University 2–5 Keio University
Yonhi College 2–2 (lottery) Waseda University

Final

Keio University 1–4 Waseda University
Waseda University won the championship.

References
 NHK

Emperor's Cup
1938 in Japanese football